is a passenger railway station in the city of Hitachiōta, Ibaraki Prefecture, operated by East Japan Railway Company (JR East).

Lines
Yagawara Station is served by the Hitachi-Ōta Spur Line of the Suigun Line, and is located 8.2 rail kilometers from the official starting point of the spur line at Kami-Sugaya Station.

Station layout
The station consists of a single side platform serving traffic in both directions. There is no station building, and station is unattended.

History
The station was closed from August 10, 1941 until October 21, 1954, when it reopened under its present name. The station was absorbed into the JR East network upon the privatization of the Japanese National Railways (JNR) on April 1, 1987.

Surrounding area

Satake Post Office

See also
List of railway stations in Japan

External links

 JR East Station information 

Railway stations in Ibaraki Prefecture
Suigun Line
Railway stations in Japan opened in 1935
 Hitachiōta, Ibaraki